Rubén Adolfo Quijada Umanzor (born December 18, 1985) is a Salvadoran football player.

Club career
Quijada started playing football at 14 with youth team Pericos del Externado San José and played for UCA before joining Luis Ángel Firpo in 2006. In May 2010 he was released by Firpo.

International career
Quijada was called up twice for El Salvador but never played an official international match.

References

External links
 

1985 births
Living people
Sportspeople from San Salvador
Association football midfielders
Salvadoran footballers
C.D. Luis Ángel Firpo footballers
El Salvador international footballers